Bleggio Superiore (Blécc de Sóra in local dialect) is a comune (municipality) in Trentino in the northern Italian region Trentino-Alto Adige/Südtirol, located about  west of Trento.  
 
Bleggio Superiore borders the following municipalities: Borgo Lares, Comano Terme, Fiavè, Ledro, Tione di Trento.

References

See also
Bleggio Inferiore

Cities and towns in Trentino-Alto Adige/Südtirol